The Abarth 124 Spider is a performance version of the Fiat 124 Spider (2016) manufactured by Mazda for FCA under the Abarth marque. It was introduced at the 2016 Geneva Motor Show, along with the racing car Abarth 124 Spider Rally. Final assembly of the car takes place in the Officine Abarth in Turin, Italy, where the model specific parts are installed on the Japanese built roadster.

Performance 

Features 
The Abarth 124 Spider features many changes from its counterpart at Fiat. On the exterior, these include Abarth badging, an optional black racing stripe hand painted on the hood and decklid, and 17 inch aluminium wheels. The interior features heated black leather and microfiber sport seats with the option of leather and Alcantara suede Recaro seats.

It also features a leather wrapped sport steering wheel and gear knob, as well as red accent stitching.

Fiat 124 Spider Abarth 
The North American-spec version was originally announced at the 2016 New York International Auto Show as the Fiat 124 Spider Elaborazione Abarth (meaning "tuned by Abarth"), with equipment roughly equivalent to the Mazda MX-5 Miata's Club Package. Unlike the standard Abarth model, it did not feature any power increase over the standard Fiat 124 Spider, and wore Fiat badges instead of Abarth badges, aside for the Elaborazione Abarth badges on the front fenders. However the 124 Spider Elaborazione Abarth was cancelled in favour of the standard Abarth model, sold as the Fiat 124 Spider Abarth due to Abarth's status as a performance trim in North America rather than a full brand. Although it wore full exterior Abarth badging, it used the Fiat badge on the steering wheel up until the 2019 model-year, due to the airbag recertification.

Abarth 124 Spider Rally

The Abarth 124 Spider Rally is a rally version of the 124 homologated in the FIA R-GT category.

Gallery

References

External links

124 Spider (2016)
Abarth vehicles
Roadsters
Cars introduced in 2016
Rear-wheel-drive vehicles
Retro-style automobiles